Karikkoselkä is a lake formed in an impact crater in Petäjävesi, Finland.  Karikkoselkä is located approximately 30 km east from the centre of Keurusselkä, a much older and larger impact crater.  Most lakes in the region are elongated in northwest–southeast direction due to glaciation, but Karikkoselkä is strikingly round.

Many shatter cones, rock formations that form under the extreme pressures of impact, have been found around the lake.  Further evidence comes from aeromagnetic maps, which show a clear magnetic anomaly in the impact crater area.  In addition, samples collected from deep drillings into the lake bottom confirm the impact origin of the structure.

The crater is the smallest identified in Finland, 1.4 km diameter and 150 m deep. Due to sediments the lake has a maximum depth of 26m which is unusually deep for a lake in the region. Karikkoselkä is estimated to be between 230 Ma and 450 Ma (million years old), most likely near 240 Ma (Triassic or earlier). Some sources give an unreasonably young age of 1.88 Ma, which is likely a misquotation – the discovery paper mentions that the bedrock in the region (known as the Central Finland Granite Complex) formed about 1.88 Ga (thousand million years ago), in the late Paleoproterozoic era.

There is evidence of a neolithic settlement on the southern shore of the lake. According to a plate erected there no excavations have yet been conducted and the age of the settlement remains unknown.

See also
Impact craters in Finland

References

External links
Karikkoselkä impact structure

Impact craters of Finland
Kymi basin
Magnetic anomalies
Triassic impact craters
Lakes of Petäjävesi
Impact crater lakes